Lonely Together may refer to:

"Lonely Together" (Barry Manilow song), 1981
"Lonely Together" (Avicii song), 2017